The Bachelor of Powalgarh (fl. 1920-1930) also known as the King of Powalgarh, was an unusually large male Bengal tiger, said to have been  long. From 1920 to 1930, the Bachelor was the most sought-after big-game trophy in the United Provinces. British hunter Jim Corbett shot and killed the Bachelor in the winter of 1930, and later told the story in his 1944 book Man-Eaters of Kumaon.

Size and previous hunter attempts
Jim Corbett first sighted the Bachelor in 1923 in a steep ravine within a secure retreat. Government rules prohibited night-time shooting, which inadvertently helped the highly sought after tiger to survive.

Corbett took Commissioner Wyndham (who he said "knows more about tigers than any other man in India") and two experienced shikaris, to view the pugmarks of the Bachelor. After the four examined and measured the pugmarks, Wyndham estimated the tiger to be ten feet (3m) long between pegs. One shikari said he was 10'5" over curves, while the other said he was 10'6" or more. All four said they had never seen larger pugmarks.

Before Corbett, many unsuccessful attempts had been made to bag the Bachelor. Two famous hunters, Fred Anderson and Huish Edye, nearly succeeded, but made small mistakes that prevented them from doing so. Anderson described the Bachelor as being "as big as a Shetland pony," while Edye said it was as big as a donkey. A herder and former poacher who had once been attacked by the Bachelor said to Corbett that the Bachelor was a shaitan (the Hindi word for 'devil') of a tiger, and was about the size of a camel.

Corbett and his sister twice measured the Bachelor’s body after he was shot by the former, albeit without independent witnesses present to certify the measurements, as being 10'7" (3.23 m) over curves.

First encounter with the tiger
In the winter of 1930, Corbett made his first hunt for the tiger, bringing his dog Robin with him. He followed the words of an old dak runner who said he saw the largest pugmarks he'd ever seen lead east to a well-wooded valley. The next morning, Robin picked up the scent of a tiger while Jim noticed large, fresh pugmarks. Fifty yards later, Robin located the tiger within a patch of clerodendron forty yards wide. Picking up Robin and entering the plants slowly, Corbett noticed the patch directly ahead swaying.

After waiting for the tiger to leave the bush, Corbett went forward with his rifle drawn, but the tiger was nowhere in sight. Robin then signalled that the tiger had gone to the left, into a deep and narrow ravine. Not armed for dealing with a tiger in close quarters, and it being breakfast time, Corbett and Robin returned home.

After breakfast, Corbett returned alone, this time armed with a .450 rifle. He heard shouting and found a man up a tree, swinging an axe and yelling. The man told Corbett that he arrived in time to save him and his buffaloes from a tiger, the size of a camel, who had threatened the herder for hours. After retreating safely to his village, the man pleaded with Corbett to kill the tiger, which he said was big enough to eat a buffalo a day, and would wipe out his livestock in twenty-five. Corbett promised to do his best.

Returning to the plains in which he led the herder's buffaloes through, he heard the call of the bachelor searching for a mate. Corbett imitated a tiger call in reply, then laid down on his elbows in the open, waiting for the tiger to come. After Corbett gave another tiger call, the bachelor called back from a hundred yards away. Eighty seconds later, the tiger's head appeared above bushes four feet (1.3m) high, within ten yards (10 m)to Corbett's right, and looking directly at him.

Corbett slowly turned his rifle, and shot the tiger an inch under his right eye. Instead of dropping dead, as Jim expected, the big cat jumped straight into the air, well above the bushes, then out of panic attacked the tree beside him, tearing it to bits while roaring. Knowing that the tiger knew where he was, Corbett feared to reload his rifle, lest the sound attract the bachelor's attention.

He lay on the ground motionless for half an hour until the branches of the tree and nearby bushes stopped waving, and the roaring became less frequent. After all the sounds of thrashing had stopped, Corbett waited for thirty more minutes before slowly crawling thirty yards backwards and hiding in a nearby tree for shelter. After several more minutes, when he was sure that the tiger was gone, Corbett left for home.

Tracking the tiger
The next morning Corbett returned to the location, along with one of his men, an expert tree climber. After reaching the open grounds, the man climbed a tree, noticing many flattened bushes around, but no signs of the tiger itself. Corbett then instructed the man back in the tree to watch over him as he scoured the ground. Near the tree Corbett found blood profusely sprinkled everywhere, and two large pools of blood and a piece of bone two square inches, which was concluded to be the part of the tiger's skull.

As a wounded tiger would growl or charge after hearing a gunshot again, Corbett fired a hundred rounds at bushes near a blood-stained tree, but to no avail. Not finding the tiger within the area, Corbett went home.

Final encounter with the tiger
The following morning the herder approached Corbett. He learned that the tiger was shot through the head and, upon his buffaloes finding dried spots of blood, concluded that the tiger must be dead. He offered Jim to use his buffaloes to find the tiger's body using their keen sense of smell, which Corbett agreed upon. Reaching the location where he shot the tiger, Corbett found a hollow filled with dead leaves, flattened with patches of blood around it.

Corbett concluded the bachelor must have been lying in the same spot yesterday while he was expending a hundred cartridges. Being uncomfortable with the thought of possibly being between a wounded tiger and a herd of buffaloes, Corbett told the herder that the next day he would search for the tiger alone.

After four days of roaming the jungle, Corbett found pugmarks of a big male tiger. Following the pugmarks led Corbett to a semul tree, which was founded by tigers. After zig-zagging through nearby bushes for an hour or more, Corbett found a tiger, head and body hidden behind a tree with only a leg sticking out. Due to there being another tiger in the area, and not wanting to risk having to deal with two wounded tigers, Corbett chose not to shoot the tiger at that moment. The tiger then moved away. Upon inspecting the spot the tiger had been standing, Corbett found drops of blood, realizing that it was the bachelor all along.

While attempting to follow the tiger, Corbett heard a sambhar cry, then a dry twig snap in the same spot as the cry, which was in a crowded bush area. Crawling on the ground, Corbett saw something red through the bushes. Crawling two yards to the right, Corbett looked up to find the tiger in front of him, staring directly at him. Two bullet shots later the tiger fell to his side without a sound, ending the hunt for the province's most sought after trophy of the decade.

He did not need to examine this tiger's pugmarks to know it was the Bachelor of Powalgarh, for his proportions were magnificent. The bullet wound from four days ago was hidden by a wrinkle of skin on the front of his head, while the back of the head had a large hole, surprisingly clean and healthy.

Knowing people heard his rifle, Corbett hurried home to relieve the anxiety of the villagers and to gather a carrying party. With his sister, Robin, and twenty men, Corbett returned to the spot where the tiger lay. Corbett measured the tiger twice, one on the spot and another at home, seven years after Wyndham and his men measured the tiger. Corbett and his sister found the tiger to be , over curves.

Sources
Information about the male Bengal tiger comes from a documentary-style story written by hunter, conservationist, and author Jim Corbett in his book Man-Eaters of Kumaon, published by the Oxford University Press in India in 1944.

See also
 Tiger versus lion
 Champawat Tiger
 Prishibinsk tiger
 Corbett National Park
 Jim Corbett
 Man-eating tigers
 Man-Eaters of Kumaon
 Tiger attack

References

External links
 Jim Corbett Foundation

Individual tigers in India
1930 in India
1930 animal deaths
Individual wild animals